Breakfasters is a long-running Australian breakfast radio show broadcast on 3RRR in Melbourne. First broadcast in 1984, the current presenting line-up of Sarah Smith, Geraldine Hickey and Daniel Burt commenced on 13 May 2019.

At launch, the program was presented by volunteers Chris Hatzis and Stratos Pavlis. In a departure from the station's usual freeform radio style, the program was more tightly presented and aimed at a broader audience than 3RRR's specialised music programming. Today, it is the station's flagship weekday program.

Notable presenters

Stratos Pavlis
Chris Hatzis
Denise Hylands
Santo Cilauro
Richard Neil
Kate Langbroek
Leaping Larry L
James (The Hound Dog) Young
John Safran
Mark (Crackman) O'Toole
Kate Paton
Dave O'Neil
Julian Schiller
Tony Moclair
Chris Venville
Marieke Hardy (Holly C)
Angus Sampson
Michaela Boland
Stephen Downes
Tony Wilson
Sam Pang
Michael Williams
Stuart Round

2010–present

In popular culture
An excerpt from a May 1986 interview between Breakfasters hosts Chris Hatzis and Stratos Pavlis and Countdown presenter Molly Meldrum is featured in the song "Volare" by TISM.

References

External links

Australian radio programs
1980s Australian radio programs
1990s Australian radio programs
2000s Australian radio programs
2010s Australian radio programs
2020s Australian radio programs